John Perle (died 1428/9), of Shrewsbury, Shropshire, was an English politician.

Perle was a Member (MP) of the Parliament of England for Shrewsbury in 1406, 1422 and 1423.

References

14th-century births
1429 deaths
English MPs 1406
Politicians from Shrewsbury
English MPs 1422
English MPs 1423